The 1950 Paris Grand Prix was a Non-Championship Formula One motor race held on 30 April 1950 at the Autodrome de Linas-Montlhéry, in Montlhéry near Paris, France. It was the fourth race of the 1950 Formula One season.

The 50-lap race was won by Talbot-Lago driver Georges Grignard, who finished four laps ahead of Louis Gérard, who finished second in a Delage, with Marc Versini third, also in a Delage. These were the only three finishers.

Results

References

Race results taken from and

Paris